The cui-ui (Chasmistes cujus) is a large sucker fish endemic to Pyramid Lake and, prior to its desiccation in the 20th century, Winnemucca Lake in northwestern Nevada. It feeds primarily on zooplankton and possibly on nanoplankton (such as algae and diatoms). The life span of cui-ui is typically about forty years, but the fish do not reach sexual maturity until at least age eight. The cui-ui is an endangered species, and one of the few surviving members of its genus.

The cui-ui population is generally improving in numbers, having attained an estimated population exceeding one million in 1993, thanks to the efforts of the U.S. Environmental Protection Agency in analysis of the Truckee River spawning grounds and of the Nevada Department of Environmental Protection and EPA in following up on protection measures. The reason the cui-ui remains endangered (though upgraded from critically endangered in 2014) is the recent history of recruitment variation, illustrating that in many years of the 1970s and 1980s there was virtually no recruitment whatsoever due to unsuccessful spawning in an unfavorable water quality and water flow environment of the Truckee River. The species' outlook is somewhat sanguine, since there is a published recovery plan based on an enhanced understanding of Pyramid Lake and Truckee River water quality, and the adoption of a protection plan by the U.S. Congress.

Pyramid Lake water quality

Pyramid Lake, the second largest natural lake in the western U.S. prior to construction of the Derby Dam, has been the focus of several water quality investigations, the most detailed starting in the mid-1980s. Under direction of the U.S. Environmental Protection Agency, a comprehensive dynamic hydrology transport model was developed by Earth Metrics Inc.; the model's name was subsequently changed to DSSAM, and it was applied to analyze impacts of a variety of land use and wastewater management decisions throughout the  Truckee River Basin. Analytes addressed included nitrogen, reactive phosphate, dissolved oxygen and ten other parameters. Based upon use of the model, some decisions have been influenced to enhance Pyramid Lake water quality and aid the viability of Pyramid Lake biota, including the cui-ui. The dynamic river model was particularly useful for analyzing Truckee River temperature variations, since the cui-ui often swim upstream to spawn, and their fry are vulnerable to elevations in river temperature.

Spawning behavior
The cui-ui is potamodromous, and will attempt to ascend the Truckee River to spawn in mid-April. If inflow is insufficient to permit this, the cui-ui may attempt to spawn in Pyramid Lake, but generally with little success due to the salinity of that lake. Water releases from the Boca reservoir and Stampede reservoirs are currently (as of 2004) timed to assist the spawning run, although in drought years this water is reserved for the Reno metropolitan area. These releases are critical to successful spawning since low warm flows at the Truckee River delta are inhospitable to upstream migration of adults. Several hatcheries are maintained by the Paiute nation to ensure that such a situation does not impact the long term viability of the cui-ui. These measures have greatly increased cui-ui populations, although it is still listed as an endangered species.

Paiute tribe

The Pyramid Lake band of Northern Paiute called themselves the "Cuiyui Ticutta", which means cui-ui eaters. Together with the Lahontan cutthroat trout the cui-ui was an important food supply for the Cuiyui Tikutta and neighboring Paiute bands who would travel to Pyramid Lake to share in the harvest during the spring spawning runs.

Subsequent to European American settlement of western Nevada in the 1860s many Cuiyui Ticutta made a living by selling fish, although the European Americans generally preferred trout to cui-ui. Cui-ui were also still important for subsistence, despite Bureau of Indian Affairs attempts to encourage farming and discourage fishing. Following the construction of Derby Dam in 1905 and diversion of much of the Truckee River's flow, the Pyramid Lake fishery declined and by 1930 it was no longer capable of supplying even subsistence food. Although conditions have improved recently, the cui-ui are now managed for symbolic and ecological purposes, and are not a food source.

See also
 Surface runoff
 Thermal pollution

References

External links

 Koch Cui-ui Hatchery
 U.S. Department of Interior cui-ui article

Catostomidae
Endemic fauna of Nevada
Freshwater fish of the United States
Fish of the Western United States
Fauna of the Great Basin
Washoe County, Nevada
Endangered fish
Endangered fauna of the United States
ESA endangered species
Fish described in 1883
Taxa named by Edward Drinker Cope